"Iskender bogazi dardir gecilmez"(tr) or Φίλα με γιατί λειώνω (el) is a Turkish and Greek folkloric tune (Karsilamas).The meter is .Its Turkish music was composed  (Kemani Serkis Efendi)(Sarkis Suciyan). Its Greek lyrics written by Stelios Chrysinis.

Agapios Tomboulis versions
Ισκεντέρ Μπογάζι(κιοτσέκικο = köçek)(İskender Boğazı dardırgeçilmez/ Ben yarimi gördüm)(Years 1930)

Original form
The original form of the karsilamas was popular in İzmir.

See also
Karsilamas
Aise

References

Turkish songs
Greek songs
Year of song missing